The canton of Saint-Barthélemy (French: Canton de Saint-Barthélemy) is a former canton of Guadeloupe. It was located in the arrondissement of Saint-Martin-Saint-Barthélemy, with its administrative seat located in Saint-Barthélemy.

Communes 
The canton's only commune, Saint-Barthélemy had a population of 8,450 in 2007 when the canton ceased to exist.

Administration

References

History of Saint Barthélemy
Saint-Barthélemy